David Agiashvili (July 28, 1949 – February 12, 2014) was a Georgian film director and screenwriter.

Biography
David Agiashvili was born in Tbilisi on July 28, 1949, in family of the writer Nikoloz Agiashvili. Graduated from faculty of philology of the Tbilisi State University majoring in Journalism.

In 1974-1977 - the editor, the senior editor and the editor-in-chief of animated association of a film studio Georgia Movie.

In 1977-1995 - the editor of the Georgian Television Movie company, since 1979 - the head of a scenario workshop.

In 1980-1985 - the teacher of the Tbilisi state university in Film-dramaturgy (where among others Miho Mosulishvili studied too) and at the Tbilisi theatrical institute in 'Fundamentals of film dramatic art'.

Was a screenwriter of feature films, the producer of documentaries: Fall of the Empire (1994). A Green Story (2012), Tbilisi, I Love You (2014). Acted in films.

The last years lived and worked in the US.

He was married to Marika Lomtatidze. His children are: Maia Agiashvili, Nika Agiashvili and George Finn

David Agiashvili died on February 12, 2014, in Los Angeles, California, US.

Filmography

As producer
 The Tunnel King (executive producer) 
 A Green Story (executive producer), 2012
 Tbilisi, I Love You (producer), 2014

As actor
 The Harsh Life of Veronica Lambert, 2009, Dato (as Dato Agiashvili)
 Gangashi, 1968, Dato (as D. Agiashvili)

As writer
 Elsa (TV Movie), 1991

References

External links

 David Agiashvili

1949 births
2014 deaths
Film people from Tbilisi
Film directors from Georgia (country)
Screenwriters from Georgia (country)